SEN may refer to:

Technology
 Small extension node
 Software Engineering Notes, a publication by the Association for Computing Machinery
 Sony Entertainment Network, a digital media delivery service

Other uses
 Sports Entertainment Network, radio network in Australia
 1116 SEN, a sports radio station in Melbourne, Australia owned by Sports Entertainment Network
 London Southend Airport (IATA airport code)
 Special educational needs
 State Enrolled Nurse

See also
 Sen (disambiguation), for forms of the word which are not acronyms

de:SEN
fr:SEN
pt:Necessidades educativas especiais